, also known as TOM'S Racing, is a factory supported racing team and tuner of Toyota and Lexus vehicles. Their head office is located in Tokyo, Japan. They are currently heavily involved with Super GT, Super Formula and Super Formula Lights. TOM'S creates aftermarket parts for current Toyota vehicles, and have also created their own special edition of certain current Lexus models.

History
The name stands for Tachi Oiwa Motor Sport, as the company was established in 1974 by Nobuhide Tachi and Kiyoshi Oiwa.  Despite an oil crisis at the time, the two were able to show productive results and a healthy development of motorsports for Toyota. With the support of Toyota, TOM'S went into business in 1974.

In 1975 the Toyota Motor Corporation officially recognized TOM'S as an authorized tuning shop. In 1978, the firm opened a garage in the Tama area of Tokyo. The tuning firm expanded to Norfolk, England with branch openings in 1987. TOM'S entered the Japanese Formula 3 as an engine tuner in 1981. In 1987 the company opened a British factory to produce Formula 3 engines for Europe. They also were F3 chassis manufacturers from 1991 to 1997.

In 1993, TOM'S produced vehicles for the Japanese Formula 3000. In 1994, the firm marked its 20th anniversary with "TOM'S Angel T01", a commemorative model. 1995 saw the lightweight sports car series T101, T082, and T020. In 2003, TOM'S modified vehicles entered the All Japan F3 Championship group of the All Japan GT Championship.

List of TOM'S complete cars

F070M Celsior (Lexus LS 400/430)
F070 Celsior (Lexus LS 400/430)
Z382 Soarer (Lexus SC)
S741 Majesta
S630 Aristo
S740 Athlete
S970 Athlete
S972 Estate
X540 Chaser
E910 Altezza (Lexus IS 300)
Toyota Altezza RS200
Land Cruiser
RX330/Harrier
Prius
H125 Alphard
Isis
W123 (MR-S)
T020 (MR-2)
T111 (Corolla AE111 Trueno)
T101
T091
T082
P050 Vitz
EP82 Starlet GT Turbo
Lexus LC (URZ100/GWZ100)
Century
Supra (J29/DB)
Supra Tourer (J29/DB)
Lexus LC500 Convertible
Lexus GS-F prod.Kazuki Nakajima
Lexus IS300
GR Yaris
GR86 Wide Body
Also the aero work done to the number 36 Castrol TOM'S SUPRA (1997 GTC 500 Champion with Michael Krumm and Pedro de la Rosa).

Motorsport 

Outside of aftermarket tuning and parts, TOM'S Racing has a long history within the world of motorsport. Since its founding in 1974, TOM'S has continuously stayed involved in automotive racing, as a tuning partner, engine supplier, or racing team, especially with Toyota factory-backed racing teams.

History

Japanese Formula 3 Championship 
TOM'S Racing had a large involvement and repeated success in the now-defunct Japanese Formula 3 Championship. They won the championship a record 21 times: in 1987, 1991, 1993, 1994, 1995, 1997, 1998, 1999, 2001, 2003, 2005, 2006, 2007, 2008, 2009, 2010, 2013, 2014, 2015, 2016, and 2018.

Super GT / JGTC 
TOM'S Racing has been consistently involved in the Super GT racing series, the top level of Japanese sports car racing, since 1995 when it was called the All Japan Grand Touring Car Championship (JGTC). They have raced both Toyota and Lexus silhouette cars. TOM'S has won the GT500 Class Championship six times: in 1997, 1999, 2006, 2008, 2017, and 2021.

24 Hours of LeMans 
From 1985 until 1993, TOM'S competed in the 24 Hours of LeMans, with a best result of 2nd place in 1992 with a Toyota TS010.

All Japan Sports Prototype Championship 
TOM'S raced in the All Japan Sports Prototype Championship in Group C, winning a championship in 1992.

Macau Grand Prix 
With the second-most team wins in history, TOM'S has won the Macau Grand Prix five times: in 1992, 1998, 1999, 2007, and 2008.

Japanese Touring Car Championship 
TOM'S won the Japanese Touring Car Championship in 1994 with a Toyota Corona E, and in 1997 with a Toyota Chaser.

Super Formula Championship 
In the top level of Japanese single-seater racing, the Super Formula Championship, TOM'S has won the championship four times: in 2011, 2012, 2014, and 2019. Additionally, in its developmental series, Super Formula Lights, TOM'S has won the championship every year since its inception, in 2020, 2021, and 2022.

References

External links

TOM'S website  
TOM'S racing website 
TOM'S USA website
TOM'S Australia website 

Automotive companies based in Tokyo
Engineering companies based in Tokyo
Manufacturing companies based in Tokyo
Automotive motorsports and performance companies
Japanese racecar constructors
Japanese auto racing teams
24 Hours of Le Mans teams
World Sportscar Championship teams
Formula Nippon teams
Super Formula teams
Super GT teams
Japanese Formula 3 Championship teams
British Touring Car Championship teams
British Formula Three teams
1974 establishments in Japan
Deutsche Tourenwagen Masters teams
International Formula 3000 teams
Toyota in motorsport
Formula Regional teams